Robert Busse Spillane (born December 14, 1995) is an American football linebacker for the Las Vegas Raiders of the National Football League (NFL). He played college football at Western Michigan.

Early life and high school
Spillane was born and grew up in Oak Park, Illinois and attended Fenwick High School. He played both running back and linebacker for the football team at Fenwick. He was rated a three-star recruit by several recruiting services and was originally recruited to play running back in college when he committed to play at Western Michigan.

College career
Spillane played four seasons for the Western Michigan Broncos, appearing in 47 games (40 games). During his college career, Spillane accumulated 312 tackles (32.5 for loss), 10 sacks, four interceptions, five pass breakups, three forced fumbles and two fumble recoveries. He was named second-team All-Mid American Conference (MAC) selection in his junior season after recording 111 tackles, including 10.5 for loss, three sack, three interceptions and two forced fumbles. As a senior, Spillane was again named second-team All-MAC after compiling 88 tackles, 11 of which were for loss, 1.5 sacks and an interception, which he returned 35 yards for a touchdown.

Professional career

Tennessee Titans
Spillane signed with the Tennessee Titans as an undrafted free agent on May 14, 2018. He was cut from the 53-man roster at the end of training camp and subsequently re-signed to the Titans practice squad on September 2. Spillane was promoted to the Titans active roster on October 9, 2018. He made his NFL debut on October 14 in a 21–0 loss to the Baltimore Ravens. Spillane was waived by the Titans on October 29, 2018.

Pittsburgh Steelers
On February 8, 2019, Spillane was signed by the Pittsburgh Steelers. He was waived on August 31, 2019 and was signed to the practice squad the next day. He was released on September 24, 2019, but re-signed on October 8. He was promoted to the active roster on November 5. Spillane finished the season with 11 tackles in eight games played.

On October 18, 2020, against the Cleveland Browns, Steelers starting inside linebacker Devin Bush Jr. tore his ACL. Spillane replaced Bush and finished the game with 5 tackles. On October 20, Steelers Coach Mike Tomlin announced that Spillane would be the starter for the remainder of the season. In Week 8 of the 2020 season, Spillane intercepted a pass from Baltimore Ravens' quarterback Lamar Jackson and returned it for a 33 yard touchdown during the 28–24 win.  This was Spillane's first turnover and touchdown of his career and he also finished the game with a team-high 11 tackles and a fumble recovery. In Week 10 against the Cincinnati Bengals, Spillane recorded his first career sack on rookie quarterback Joe Burrow during the 36–10 win. He was placed on injured reserve on December 12, 2020. He was activated from injured reserve on January 9, 2021.

Spillane re-signed with the Steelers on a one-year contract on March 24, 2021.

On March 11, 2022, the Steelers placed a restricted free agent tender on Spillane.

Las Vegas Raiders
On March 16, 2023, Spillane signed a two-year contract with the Las Vegas Raiders.

Personal life
Spillane is the grandson of 1953 Heisman Trophy winner, College Football Hall of Famer and NFL halfback Johnny Lattner.

References

External links
Pittsburgh Steelers bio
Western Michigan Broncos bio

1995 births
Living people
Sportspeople from Oak Park, Illinois
Players of American football from Illinois
American football linebackers
Western Michigan Broncos football players
Tennessee Titans players
Pittsburgh Steelers players
Las Vegas Raiders players